Yelena Ivanovna Bolsun (born March 10, 1983, in Irkutsk) is a Russian female former sprinter who specialised in the 200 metres. She represented her country in that discipline at the 2004 Summer Olympics, reaching the quarter-finals. She competed at the World Championships in Athletics on four occasions, three times in the 200 m and once in the 4 × 100 metres relay.

Among her international honours were a 200 m gold medal at the 2003 Summer Universiade, a silver at the 2005 European Cup, and a gold and two silvers at the 2007 Military World Games.

Bolsun won the 200 m at the Russian Athletics Championships in 2003.

International competitions

National titles
Russian Athletics Championships
200 m: 2003

References

sports-reference

1983 births
Living people
Sportspeople from Irkutsk
Russian female sprinters
Olympic female sprinters
Olympic athletes of Russia
Athletes (track and field) at the 2004 Summer Olympics
Universiade gold medalists in athletics (track and field)
Universiade gold medalists for Russia
Medalists at the 2003 Summer Universiade
World Athletics Championships athletes for Russia
Russian Athletics Championships winners